María Edelia Giro (born 12 May 1971) is an Argentine biathlete. She competed at the 1992 Winter Olympics and the 1994 Winter Olympics.

References

1971 births
Living people
Biathletes at the 1992 Winter Olympics
Biathletes at the 1994 Winter Olympics
Argentine female biathletes
Olympic biathletes of Argentina
Place of birth missing (living people)